Denis Armar O'Conor, O'Conor Don (1912–10 July 2000) was hereditary Chief of the Name O'Conor, and is a direct descendant of Tairrdelbach Ua Conchobair, the last High King of Ireland with a surviving male-line lineage and was seen by some as a nominal claimant to that defunct position.

Early years
Denis Armar O'Conor was born in London in January 1912. His father Charles William O'Conor, the son of Denis Maurice O'Conor second son of Denis O'Conor, O'Conor Don, and Ellen Isabella Kevill-Davies daughter of Rev. William Trevalyan Kevill-Davies of Croft Castle. His father was the nephew of Charles Owen O'Conor, O'Conor Don. Charles William lived at his mothers family home of Croft Castle in Herefordshire. His mother Evelyn Lowry-Corry was the daughter of Admiral Hon. Armar Lowry-Corry, a younger son of the Armar Lowry-Corry, 3rd Earl Belmore and Geraldine King-King daughter of James King King of Stanton Park House, Herefordshire. His grandmother Geraldine was also a niece of Lieutenant General Colin MacKenzie. The young Denis won a classical bursary to Downside where he was captain of boxing.

Life

He went to the Royal Military Academy Sandhurst in 1930. He continued to box there and was also noted for his horsemanship, originally learned from his father and honed while hunting in Ireland and Herefordshire. Despite the harsh discipline at Sandhurst, he managed to lead a hectic social life in London.

In 1931 he was commissioned in to the Lincolnshire Regiment and served in India and China. India especially gave him the opportunity to hunt, play polo, go pig-sticking and shoot. He had one of the highest handicaps at polo in India and China during his time there, and played against the American army in the Philippines; in China he owned and trained horses, one of which, Kilrea, won several races in Hong Kong. A wild and spirited young man with an eye for the girls, he enjoyed Army life in the East to the limit and often beyond.

In the Second World War, O'Conor saw action at the Battle of Dunkirk, however he saw no further action due to a training accident involving a grenade. However, he continued in the military in a training and administrative capacity. 
He retired with the rank of Major in 1946 and moved to live in Roundwood, County Wicklow, where his father had bought a farm.

He was not well off and he abandoned farming to become a representative for a firm that sold tractors to farmers. Later he became an inspector for the Society for the Prevention of Cruelty to Animals.

Field sports were an important to him all his life. He hunted foxhounds, beagles, Otterhound and Basset Hound at various times. He was a former Master of Delgany Beagles, a popular pack among university students (whose real interest lay in courting, not hunting). He became an acknowledged expert on hounds of all types - and was asked to judge at various shows throughout Ireland and occasionally in England. His love of dogs and his way with them was legendary. In the early 1970s, he moved to Dún Laoghaire in Dublin.

O'Conor succeeded as O'Conor Don on the death in 1981 of his second cousin, Father Charles O'Conor, the former provincial of the Jesuit Order in Ireland. Whereas the Jesuits in their austere way had insisted that Fr. O'Conor not call himself O'Conor Don, Denis O'Conor acclaimed the title with relish, and enjoyed its prerogatives to the full. However, Denis was not to inherit the family estate of Clonalis outside Castlerea, County Roscommon.

He became chairman of historical and genealogical societies, a regular presiding presence at community events and was even involved in tourist promotion.
He was founding member of the Council of Irish Chieftains, consisting of the descendants of the few princely families whose pedigrees have been authenticated by the Chief Herald of Ireland. 
He used his position to promote an interest in Irish heritage from genealogy, local history to archaeology. He became president of the Dún Laoghaire Genealogical Society in 1991 and President of the Genealogical Society of Ireland in 1999. He was also deputy chairman of the Standing Council of Irish Chiefs and Chieftains.

Personal life
He married, in 1936, Elizabeth Marris, daughter of Rev. Stanley Punshon Marris, and had issue:
 
Desmond Roderic O'Conor (b. 22 September 1938), a banker, formerly of Schroders and then regional director of Kleinwort Benson for South America, who was married on 23 May 1964 to Virginia Williams, daughter of British diplomat Michael S. Williams and had issue.

Denis O'Conor's marriage to Elizabeth did not long outlast the birth of their only son. Elizabeth subsequently married James Cameron.

In 1943, O'Conor married Rosemary O'Connell-Hewett, daughter of former Indian Army officer Capt. James Pearse Bowen O'Connell-Hewett, and a direct descendant of Daniel O'Connell, the 19th-century Irish Liberator, through his daughter Ellen O'Connell, and had a daughter and two sons.

 Gail O'Conor (b.1943 - d.1957), died aged thirteen.
Kieran Denis O'Conor (b. 28 October 1958), a senior lecturer in Archaeology in NUI Galway, who was married on 26 August 1988 to Karena Mary Morton, and had issue.
Rory Dominic O'Conor (b. 1 January 1963), who was married on 21 August 1999 to Cecilia Emily Gleeson, and had issue.

Because he was divorced, O'Conor was precluded from following the family tradition of becoming a member of the Order of Malta but he joined and eventually became Grand Prior of the Irish priory of the Oecumenical Order of St Lazarus of Jerusalem, which contributes to the relief of leprosy. His also taught disabled children to ride.

The O'Conor Don died on 10 July 2000 aged 88 and was buried at the family plot in Castlerea graveyard on the edge of the family estate. His eldest son, Desmond, who lives in Sussex, succeeded as O'Conor Don.

Ancestry

Descent from High King of Ireland
Denis O'Conor Don is reputedly descended from the High King of Ireland via the following line of descent:
 Denis O'Conor Don
 Charles William O'Conor
 Denis Maurice O'Conor
 Denis O'Conor Don
 Owen O'Conor, O'Conor Don
 Denis O'Conor
 Charles O'Conor
 Denis O'Conor
 Cathal Oge O'Conor
 Cathal O'Conor
 Sir Hugh O'Conor Don
 Dermod O'Conor Don
 Carbery O'Conor, O'Conor Don
 Owen Ceach O'Conor, O'Conor Don
 Fedlim Geancach Ó Conchobair Donn, King of Connacht
 Toirdhealbhach Óg Donn Ó Conchobair, King of Connacht
 Aedh mac Tairdelbach Ó Conchobair, King of Connacht
 Toirdelbach Ó Conchobair, King of Connacht
 Hugh O'Conor, King of Connacht
 Eoghan MacRuaidrí O'Conor
 Ruaidrí MacAedh O'Conor
 Hugh O'Conor, King of Connacht
 Cathal Crobhdearg O'Conor, King of Connacht
 Tairrdelbach Ua Conchobair, King of Connacht, High King of Ireland

Distinctions
 Order of Saint Lazarus (statuted 1910)

References 

1912 births
2000 deaths
Denis
British Army personnel of World War II
Royal Lincolnshire Regiment officers